Public Choice is a peer-reviewed academic journal covering the intersection of economics and political science. It was established in 1966 as Papers on Non-Market Decision Making, obtaining its current name in 1968. It is published 16 times per year by Springer Science+Business Media and the editor-in-chief is William F. Shughart II (Utah State University).

According to the Journal Citation Reports, its 2015 impact factor is 0.900, ranking it 73rd out of 163 journals in the category "Political Science".

See also 
 List of political science journals

References

External links

Political science journals
Springer Science+Business Media academic journals
Publications established in 1966
English-language journals
Economics journals
8 times per year journals